Walter Sumner "Tam" Rose (December 5, 1888 – October 2, 1961) was an American football player at Syracuse University and then a player and coach with the Tonawanda Kardex, including during the team's brief stint in the National Football League (NFL) He played halfback and served as the team's head coach from its founding in 1916. The team played only one game in the NFL before folding in 1921.

Rose was a captain of the football team at Syracuse University from 1913 to 1915 and was twice selected to Walter Camp's All-American team. He was the leading point scorer for Syracuse.

References
 1919 Buffalo Prospects
Picture of Tam Rose
The life of Tam Rose

1888 births
1961 deaths
American football halfbacks
Syracuse Orange football players
Tonawanda Kardex coaches
Tonawanda Kardex players
People from Tonawanda, New York
Players of American football from New York (state)